Haïti en Marche is a weekly newspaper published in Haiti. It was founded in Miami, Florida in 1986 by Elsie Ethéart and Marcus Garcia.

References

French-language newspapers published in the United States
Haitian-American culture in Miami
Newspapers published in Haiti
Newspapers established in 1986
1986 establishments in Florida